Bolívar Partido  is a partido (second level administrative subdivision) located in central Buenos Aires Province, Argentina.

The partido has 5,027 km² (1,941 sq mi) and a population of 32,442, and its capital is San Carlos de Bolívar.

Settlements
San Carlos de Bolívar
Hale
Juan F. Ibarra	
Mariano Unzué	
Paula (Est. La Paula)	
Pirovano	
Villa Lynch Pueyrredón
Vallimanca
Urdampilleta
 Santander, origen España

External links
 Official site of Gobierno Municipal del Partido de Bolívar
 Tourism Bolívar
  Federal website
 La Mañana, Bolívar newspaper

1938 establishments in Argentina
Partidos of Buenos Aires Province